Neil Stephen Fiala is a former Major League Baseball player. He played in five games in the majors in September , all as a pinch hitter. He pinch-hit three times for the St. Louis Cardinals without a hit, then was traded to the Cincinnati Reds on September 10 along with pitcher Joe Edelen for veteran reliever Doug Bair.

In his first appearance for the Reds on September 16, Fiala got his one and only major league hit, a single against Mike Rowland of the San Francisco Giants. Fiala drove in one run with the hit, and scored another run later in the inning. Coincidentally, the player for whom he was pinch-hitting was Edelen. His final appearance came 12 days later—again pinch-hitting for Edelen—when he struck out against Alan Hargesheimer.

In the minor leagues, Fiala was used mostly as a second baseman. From  until , Fiala served as manager for the River City Rascals of the independent Frontier League.

References

Sources

St. Louis Cardinals players
Cincinnati Reds players
Gastonia Cardinals players
St. Petersburg Cardinals players
Arkansas Travelers players
Southern Illinois Salukis baseball players
Springfield Redbirds players
Indianapolis Indians players
Baseball players from Missouri
1956 births
Living people